The 1984 Torneo Internazionale Citta di Treviso was a men's tennis tournament played on indoor carpet courts in Treviso, Italy that was part of the 1984 Volvo Grand Prix circuit. It was the only edition of the tournament and was played from 12 November until 18 November 1984. First-seeded Vitas Gerulaitis won the singles title.

Finals

Singles
 Vitas Gerulaitis defeated  Tarik Benhabiles 6–1, 6–1
 It was Gerulaitis' only singles title of the year and the 26th and last of his career.

Doubles
 Pavel Složil /  Tim Wilkison defeated  Jan Gunnarsson /  Sherwood Stewart 6–2, 6–3
 It was Složil's 7th doubles title of they year and the 26th of his career. It was Wilkison's only doubles title of the year and the 4th of his career.

References

External links
 ITF tournament edition details

Torneo Internazionale Citta di Treviso
Torneo Internazionale Citta di Treviso
Tennis tournaments in Italy